McKinney High School (MHS) is located at 1400 Wilson Creek Parkway in McKinney, Texas, and is within the McKinney Independent School District. MHS is the oldest high school in McKinney and the current building opened in 1986, after moving from what is now Faubion Middle School.  The school underwent major renovations from 2013-2015 and added a Fine Arts/Performing Arts Center in 2018. 

The Texas Education Agency (TEA) rated the school as Recognized following the 2009-10 school year, and most recently, the school is an 2022 A Rated Campus scoring 90/100.

Academics 
Advanced Placement offerings include Art History, Biology, Calculus AB and BC, Chemistry, Computer Science A, English Language and Composition, English Literature and Composition, Environmental Science, European History, French Language, German Language, Human Geography, Latin Literature, Macroeconomics, Music Theory, Physics C – Mechanics and Electricity/Magnetism, Psychology, Statistics, Spanish Language, Spanish Literature, Studio Art – 2D, 3D, 4D, and Drawing, US Government and Politics, US History, and World History.

Athletics
The McKinney Lions compete in the following sports:

 Baseball
 Basketball
 Cross Country
 Football
 Golf
 Powerlifting
 Soccer
 Softball
 Swimming and Diving
 Tennis
 Track and Field
 Volleyball
 Wrestling

Notable alumni

 Adrianna Hicks, actress
 Brittany Lang, Professional golfer
 Zach Lee, Major League Baseball player
 Matt Lipka, baseball player
 Hunter Mahan, Professional golfer
 Adam Miller Professional baseball player
 Johnny Quinn, Professional football player and U.S. Olympian (bobsled)
 Robert Richardson, NASCAR Driver
 J. Michael Tatum, Anime voice actor for FUNimation
 Sammy Walker, NFL player
 London Woodberry, MLS- FC Dallas
 Nora Zehetner, Actress
Akayleb Evans

References

External links 
 Official website
 McKinney ISD Website

McKinney Independent School District high schools